Paul Darden, Jr. (born October 27, 1968) is an American professional poker player, rap music promoter, and night club owner from New Haven, Connecticut.

Early years

He was accused of murder at the age of 15, due to mistaken identity but was acquitted. Poker was Darden's way of turning his life around, and he was helped in this by his mentor, Phil Ivey.

Poker career

Originally, he was best known as a seven-card stud player, where he had several notable tournament finishes in 2000 prior to winning the World Series of Poker (WSOP) bracelet in 2001 for the $2,500 seven-card stud event, defeating Tom Franklin heads-up.

In 2002, Darden won a World Poker Tour (WPT) title in the $3,000 main event of the Gold Rush tournament. He would later finish in 2nd place behind Gus Hansen in the WPT Bad Boys of Poker invitational event. Additionally, in March 2005 he finished 5th in the $10,000 main event of the PartyPoker.com Million IV cruise.

In 2003, he made his first money finish in the $10,000 WSOP main event, finishing in 45th place. He cashed in the same event in 2005.

Darden is also the mentor of professional poker player Amnon Filippi.

As of 2010, his total live tournament winnings exceed $2,100,000 with his 16 cashes at the WSOP accounting for $287,456 of those winnings.

References

External links
 World Poker Tour Profile
 Hendon Mob tournament results
 Pokulator 10 Questions Interview

American poker players
Living people
World Poker Tour winners
World Series of Poker bracelet winners
1968 births
Nightclub owners
People acquitted of murder